Space Chimps is a 2008 computer-animated science fiction comedy film directed by Kirk DeMicco (in his directional debut), who wrote the screenplay with Rob Moreland. It features the voices of Andy Samberg, Cheryl Hines, Jeff Daniels, Patrick Warburton, Kristin Chenoweth, Kenan Thompson, Zack Shada, Carlos Alazraqui, Omid Abtahi, Patrick Breen, Jane Lynch, Kath Soucie, and Stanley Tucci.

The film follows three chimpanzees who go into space to an alien planet. 20th Century Fox theatrically released the film on July 18, 2008, and was panned by critics. The film grossed $64.8 million on a $37 million budget. It received an Artios Award nomination for Outstanding Achievement in Casting – Animation Feature. A video game based on the film was also released in July 2008.

A direct-to-video sequel, entitled Space Chimps 2: Zartog Strikes Back, was released in October 2010.

Plot
In outer space, an unmanned, intelligent life-searching NASA space probe, Infinity, is dragged into an intergalactic wormhole and crash-lands on the other side of the galaxy. It lands on the Earth-like alien planet named Malgor, populated by colorful alien beings. Zartog (Jeff Daniels), an evil-minded inhabitant, accidentally discovers how to take manual control of the onboard machinery and uses it to enslave the population. Faced with the possible extinction of Infinity and their budget, the scientists hire multiple chimpanzees as astronauts to regain contact with the probe and retrieve it: technical genius Comet (Zack Shada), lieutenant Luna (Cheryl Hines) and commander Titan (Patrick Warburton). For media attention, the Senator (Stanley Tucci) adds to the team Ham III (Andy Samberg), grandson of Ham, the first chimpanzee in space, who works as a cannonball at a circus. Ham III is uninterested in the mission, but he (along with the other space chimps (except Comet)) is launched into space despite his best efforts to escape the scientist's training facility.

Ham, Luna and Titan enter the wormhole, where the latter two pass out from the pressure, leaving Ham with the task of getting the ship out and landing it. The ship and Titan are taken by Zartog's henchmen, and Titan teaches Zartog about the probe's features. Ham and Luna journey to Zartog's palace. Ham reveals that he believes Space Chimps is a joke in which makes Luna angry at him. They receiving guidance from inhabitant Kilowatt (Kristin Chenoweth). They go into a valley of the aliens' food where they meet some globhoppers, and then they go into the cave of the Flesh-Devouring Beast where Kilowatt sacrifices themselves by getting eaten by the monster so Ham and Luna bypass it, They then go inside the Dark Cloud of Id in which they fall out of. Once at the palace, they rescue Titan and plan to leave. However, Ham, Luna and Titan alter their course of action after noticing Zartog torturing the inhabitants who are being frozen in a pool of freznar, feeling they owe it to Kilowatt to rescue the planet.

Zartog then attacks the chimpanzees with the probe. Just as they are about to get destroyed, Titan tricks Zartog into what he thought could have him dominate the universe, triggering an ejection mechanism in the probe, which in turn leads to his defeat by falling into the freznar. The chimps then discover that Kilowatt has survived, and they make contact with Comet and Houston (Carlos Alazraqui), a friend of Ham's grandfather, back on Earth through a walkie-talkie. Since the ship they boarded is not on Malgor as the chimpanzees jumped out during its launch, Comet, Luna, and Titan use a different method to exit the planet. They redesign the probe, with help from the planet's inhabitants, and use an erupting volcano to thrust it off the planet's gravity.

The chimpanzees go into space, and just as they are about to re-enter the wormhole, Titan hands the controls over to Ham, the one who can withstand the pressure and thus pilot the ship. Ham, although initially skeptical, is motivated by a mental conversation with his grandfather's spirit; he maneuvers the ship back to Earth and lands it with Luna's help, and the Senator, under pressure from the press, decides to dramatically increase the space program's funding. The scientists celebrate the chimpanzee' return.

Cast
 Andy Samberg as Ham III, Ham I's grandson and a circus chimpanzee who loves cannon acts and crashing. 
 Cheryl Hines as Luna, Titan's lieutenant who is fearless and intelligent and Ham’s love interest.
 Patrick Warburton as Titan, the flamboyant commander of the expedition. He has a great love of chimpanzee puns.
 Jeff Daniels as Zartog, an alien tyrant who enslaves the planet Malgor.
 Kristin Chenoweth as Kilowalawhizasahooza (Kilowatt for short), a young alien who befriends Ham and Luna.
 Kenan Thompson as The Ringmaster, the owner of a circus where Ham III works.
 Zack Shada as Comet, a technical genius chimp.
 Carlos Alazraqui as Houston, a friend of Ham's grandfather. and Piddles the Clown.
 Omid Abtahi as Dr. Jagu
 Patrick Breen as Dr. Bob
 Jane Lynch as Dr. Poole
 Kath Soucie as Dr. Smothers
 Stanley Tucci as The Senator
 Wally Wingert as Splork, Infinity Probe, and Pappy Ham
 Tom Kenny as Newsreel
 Jason Harris as Guard

Production 
In 2002, Kirk DeMicco conceived a film premise of anthropomorphic chimpanzees on a spaceship from viewing The Right Stuff (1983), a fictional depiction of the Mercury Seven program. It included the line, "Does a monkey know he's sitting on top of a rocket that might explode?" which made him wonder what happened if the monkey knew. Shortly after the lightbulb moment, he saw the famous space chimpanzee Ham on the cover of a 1961 issue of Life magazine; the chimpanzee's smug expression gave him the idea of a self-centered protagonist going on a dangerous space mission. Using the Life magazine issue with him, DeMicco pitched his ideas to John H. Williams, comparing the plot to that of Tommy Boy (1995). Williams was instantly hooked and began working with him from there. They later decided on "a great sci-fi adventure" for children that was also a mocking of science fiction media in the same way the Shrek films, which Williams also produced, parodied fairy tales. De Micco wanted the planet to have the vibe of the Mos Eisley cantina of the Star Wars series.

The project and its name, Space Chimps, were first publicized in a Variety article on June 7, 2004, announcing it was next in Vanguard's production line after Valiant (2005). The film was produced in two years by Williams' Vanguard Animation studio with a team of around 170, a $37 million budget, and DeMicco as director. For the film, a new pipeline was created, as well as a studio constructed in Vancouver. Chris Bacon was chosen as composer, who was recommended to DeMicco by James Newton Howard. The limited budget meant creative choices had to be made for the music to sound interesting; according to DeMicco, beds were occasionally used alongside the orchestra, and the Blue Man Group played PVC pipes.

Release 
On April 11, 2006, 20th Century Fox signed a deal with Vanguard minority owner IDT Entertainment to distribute four films, the second in line being Space Chimps.

Space Chimps was originally set to be released on May 2, 2008, but on December 19, 2007, the movie's release date was changed to July 18, 2008. This was mainly because of the 2007–08 Writers Guild of America strike.

Reception

Critical response
Rotten Tomatoes reported that 33% of professional critics gave positive reviews based on 92 reviews. The consensus states: "Space Chimps cheap animation and overabundance of monkey puns feels especially dated in a post WALL-E world." On Metacritic, the film holds a 36/100 based on 18 critics, indicating "generally unfavorable reviews". Audiences polled by CinemaScore gave the film an average grade of "B+" on an A+ to F scale.

Roger Ebert gave a positive review of three stars and saying in his review that "Space Chimps is delightful from beginning to end." The New York Times said that Space Chimps was "hilarious".  Lael Loewenstein of Variety called it "fairly fatuous but enjoyably slim family entertainment".

Box office 
The film has grossed $30.1 million in the United States, and $34.7 million in other countries, totalling $64.8 million worldwide. The film was released in the United Kingdom on August 1, 2008, and opened on #7, grossing £563,543.

On its opening weekend, Space Chimps was number seven with a gross of $7.1 million in 2,511 theatres, with an $2,860 average; it was a poor opening for the film, debuting on (at the time) the highest-grossing box office weekend ever in the United States.

Awards

Home media 
20th Century Fox Home Entertainment released Space Chimps on DVD and Blu Ray on November 25, 2008.

Video game

A video game based on the film was released in July 2008, published by Brash Entertainment and developed by Redtribe, Wicked Witch Software and WayForward Technologies.

Sequel

The sequel was released in May 2010 to cinemas in the United Kingdom, and premiered direct to video in October 2010 in the United States. It was universally panned by critics, and grossed just over $4 million during its theatrical run.

See also
 Space Chimps 2: Zartog Strikes Back
 Space Chimps (video game)

References

External links

 
 
 
 
 

 
2008 films
2008 computer-animated films
2000s adventure comedy films
2000s science fiction comedy films
2000s American animated films
Animated films about apes
American adventure comedy films
American children's animated space adventure films
American children's animated comic science fiction films
British adventure comedy films
British science fiction comedy films
British children's films
Canadian adventure comedy films
Canadian animated science fiction films
Canadian children's animated films
Canadian science fiction comedy films
2000s children's adventure films
Films produced by Barry Sonnenfeld
Films produced by John H. Williams
Films set on fictional planets
Animated films about animals
Animals in space
20th Century Fox animated films
20th Century Fox films
20th Century Studios franchises
Vanguard Animation
2000s children's films
2000s children's animated films
2008 directorial debut films
2008 comedy films
2000s English-language films
2000s Canadian films
2000s British films
2000s American films
The Weinstein Company animated films